Petersham Common could refer to:

Petersham Common Historic District
Petersham Common, London